The Nelung Arts Center is an art center in Colombo, Sri Lanka. Opened in 2010, it houses a dance school, a theater and an art gallery. Established by the Nelung Arts Foundation which was founded by Niloufer Pieris a former Sri Lankan ballerina, the center is managed by the Royal Nelung Foundation under the preview of the Royal College Union.

Design and features 
Design and built as a multi-purpose building at Hyde Park Corner, it is equipped with a dance studio, open-air theatre and atrium that hosts art exhibitions as well as support facilities such as offices and car parks. It was built in an eco friendly nature with rainwater harvesting, ecobricks and natural ventilation and lighting.

See also
Theatre of Sri Lanka
Lionel Wendt Art Centre

References

External links
Nelung Arts Centre website
‘The arts are good business’

Theatres in Colombo District
Cultural buildings in Colombo
Royal College Union
Tourist attractions in Colombo